Latania loddigesii is a species of palm tree. The species is named in honor of Joachim Loddiges. It is endemic to Mauritius, where the only remaining populations are located on the offshore islands. It is also grown as an ornamental plant. Its common names include latanier de l'Ile Ronde and latanier de Maurice.

Gallery

References

loddigesii
Endemic flora of Mauritius
Endangered plants
Taxonomy articles created by Polbot